Aniki may refer to:

 Billy Herrington (1969-2018), American model and pornographic film actor referred to as 'Aniki' by Japanese fans
 Ichirou Mizuki (1948-2022), Japanese musical artist
 Takeshi Kaneshiro (born 1973), Japanese-Taiwanese actor and singer
 Ryo Mizunami (born 1988), Japanese professional wrestler

See also
 
Nikolay Anikin